Anglo-Chinese College may refer to:

 Ying Wa College, Hong Kong (founded as Anglo-Chinese College in Malacca in 1818)
 Anglo-Chinese College (Fuzhou), Fuzhou, China
 Anglo-Chinese College (Shanghai), Shanghai
 Anglo-Chinese College, Shantou
 Anglo-Chinese College, Tianjin
 Anglo-Chinese College, Tinkling
 Anglo-Chinese College, Xiamen